Alquízar is a town and municipality in the Artemisa Province of Cuba.

History
The settlement was first mentioned in 1616, as a coffee plantation owned by Don Sancho de Alquízar, who gives the name of the community. In 1826, a garrison was established here, and it was incorporated in 1879.

Geography
The town is located in the south-east corner of the province, south-west of San Antonio de los Baños and west of Güira de Melena.

The municipality is divided into the barrios of Guanímar, La Paz, Pueblo (capital), San Andrés and Tumbadero.

The municipality is divided into  consejos populares (i.e. "popular councils"):  Mayorquín - Sur (main town is El Mayorquín), Norte, Dagame, and Pulido - Guanímar.

Demographics
In 2004, the municipality of Alquízar had a population of 29,616.

See also
Alquízar Municipal Museum
Municipalities of Cuba
List of cities in Cuba

References

External links

Populated places in Artemisa Province